A brief three-month conflict was fought between Liu Wenhui and Liu Xiang in Sichuan during the Warlord Era from October to December 1932. The wider repercussions of the war leading to the growing power of the Central government of the Republic of China in the province.

Background 
The Two-Liu war was a conflict fought in Chinese province of Sichuan in 1932. Sichuan at the time was divided into 6 garrison areas each commanded by a warlord. Despite the unification of China in 1928 following the Northern Expedition the local Sichuan warlords did not cease their wars or conflicts instead engaging in arms races and recruiting larger numbers of men when the nanjing government wanted the exact opposite. The two members of the Liu family were Liu Xiang and his uncle Liu Wenhui. Liu Xiang controlled the eastern third of Sichuan along with the provincial capital Chongqing. Prior to the war the 2 relatives enjoyed amiabl relations purchasing a joint airforce and armoured car force. Liu Xiang would had ambitions to seize more land and wealth as typical of warlords of the era. Liu Wenhui had also been luring away Liu Xiang's officers with higher pay something he did to the other warlords within the province. Sichuan armies of this period did not possess much weaponry beyond rifles with mountain guns and machine guns being an oddity on the battlefield therefore the advantage of planes and armoured cars is multiplied by the lack of anti-aircraft weaponry or anti-tank weaponry.

War 
In October 1932 Liu Xiang declared 'The war to Stabilise Sichuan' though due to the familial nature of the war it quickly was given the name the Two-Liu war.

October Offensive of Liu Xiang

Battle of Chengte 
On the 8th of October forces of Liu Xiang were defeated whilst attempting to seize the city.

Battle of Yungchen 
On the 10th of October 7,000 of Liu Wenhui's soldiers defected to the army of Liu Xiang after a defeat.

Tibetan Raids 
Tibetan tribesmen encouraged by the warfare invaded the province of Xikang and began raiding the province this led to calls for peace which saw a brief end to the fighting until the 21st when it restarted due to movements by the armies of Liu Xiang.

Withdrawal from the East 
Liu Wenhui ordered his men to withdraw towards the western towns of Dongnan, Jiangzhun, Yongzhan and Dazhu. Liu Xiang pursued his Uncle's army as it retreated both sides resorted to pressganging to recruit soldiers and porters for their armies.

Conflict in the west 
As Liu Xiang's forces and those of his allies approached the west they began attacking with Liu Xiang's airforce launching bombing raids on the enemy. on the 28th of October Yang Sen's forces reached the Western gates of Chengdu, where after heavy fighting in the suburbs they were repeatedly beaten back.

Conflict until July. 
Liu Xiang's forces took Chengdu Yangchun and Kiangtsin. Liu Wenhui unable to import weaponry, due to a ban by the Central government in Nanjing aiming to stop the conflict, was unable to re-equip his forces or raise new ones with the rapid nature of the warfare foreign importation was too lengthy of a process. 

On the 9th of November following a bloody battle at Luzhou Liu Wenhui withdrew to the western bank of the Tuojiang with 90,000 men defending the river bank.

Liu Xiang rejected an overture for peace from Liu Wenhui and thoroughly defeated his enemy at the battle of the Tuojiang. Following this battle Liu Wenhui attempted suicide but was saved by a local doctor and made a full recovery. Liu Wenhui on the 29th of December began negotiations for peace offering to resign his governorship of Sichuan and withdraw his forces to Xikang province in order to establish a new warlord base in that province with the still large forces under his command.

This was accepted by his enemies and Liu Wenhui's army withdrew into Xikang though minor clashes in Sichuan occurred as they withdrew.

Aftermath 
In Late December 1932 forces of the 4th route army entered Sichuan after initial settlement they were driven off in Spring 1933 they returned later that year occupying 14 counties and capturing a supply dump at Suiding. Liu Xiang and other warlords fearing the arrival of more Communist forces currently in Guizhou conducting the long march began preparing for war against the 4th route army. Liu Xiang's offensive with his warlords failed due to infighting Liu Xiang like many warlords was a notorious extractor of wealth via taxes but even this was not sufficient as the large costs of the war led to payment of workers falling into arrears and strikes ensued. Liu Xiang was forced to appeal for Chiang Kai Shek for assistance which was forthcoming but at the cost of autonomy.

References 

Warlord Era
Military history of Sichuan
1932 in China